= Chen Greif =

Computer scientist

- חן גרייף
- Education: Tel Aviv University, University of British Columbia
- Known for: Iterative solvers, preconditioning techniques, numerical linear algebra
- Awards: Fellow of the Society for Industrial and Applied Mathematics (2022)
- Scientific career
- Fields: Scientific Computing, Numerical Linear Algebra
- Workplaces: University of British Columbia
- Thesis: (1998)

Chen Greif (Hebrew: חן גרייף) is a professor and former department head of computer science at the University of British Columbia. In March 2022 he was elected a fellow of the Society for Industrial and Applied Mathematics for "contributions to scientific computing, especially in numerical linear algebra and its applications."

== Education ==
Greif attended Tel Aviv University, earning a bachelor's degree 1991 and a master's degree in 1994 in mathematics. He continued his education at the University of British Columbia, where he was awarded a PhD in Applied Mathematics in 1998. He was also a postdoctoral fellow at Stanford University from 1998 to 2000.

== Research ==
His research is primarily concerning scientific computing and more specifically:

- Matrix theory and analysis
- Iterative solvers and preconditioning techniques for sparse linear systems
- Saddle-point linear systems
- Numerical solution of elliptic partial differential equations
- Linear algebra aspects of constrained optimization problems

== Selected publication ==
=== Books ===
- Ascher UM, Greif C, editors. A first course in numerical methods. Society for Industrial and Applied Mathematics; 2011 June 22. Cited 166 times in Google Scholar

=== Articles ===
- Golub GH, Greif C. On solving block-structured indefinite linear systems. SIAM Journal on Scientific Computing. 2003;24(6):2076-92. Cited 181 times in Google Scholar
- Avron H, Sharf A, Greif C, Cohen-Or D. ℓ1-sparse reconstruction of sharp point set surfaces. ACM Transactions on Graphics (TOG). 2010 Nov 5;29(5):1-2. Cited 145 times in Google Scholar
- Golub GH, Greif C. An Arnoldi-type algorithm for computing page rank. BIT Numerical Mathematics. 2006 Dec 1;46(4):759-71. Cited 121 times in Google Scholar
- Greif C, Schötzau D. Preconditioners for the discretized time-harmonic Maxwell equations in mixed form. Numerical Linear Algebra with Applications. 2007 May;14(4):281-97.Cited 114 times in Google Scholar
